17 Delphini is a solitary star in the equatorial constellation Delphinus. It has an absolute magnitude of −0.64  and apparent magnitude of 5.18, allowing it to be faintly seen with the naked eye.

17 Delphini is an orange giant that is most likely on the horizontal branch (84% probability). At present it has 2.33 times the mass of the Sun, but at an age of 832 million years — has expanded to 23.36 times the radius of the Sun.

17 Del is suspected to be a variable star of unknown type ranging from 5.16 to 5.27.

References

Delphinus (constellation)
K-type giants
Delphini, 17
199253
103294
8011
Suspected variables
BD+13 4572